Humberto García may refer to:

Humberto Leal Garcia (1973–2011), Mexican criminal and inmate on death row in Texas
Humberto Tony García, American voice actor and announcer
Humberto García Reyes (born 1953), Mexican politician
Humberto García (footballer), Paraguayan football manager and former player
Humberto Garcia, guitar player on 4 (Kumbia Kings album)